is an island located in Ise Bay off the east coast of central Honshu, Japan. It is administered as part of the city of Toba in Mie Prefecture. 

Ōzukumi-jima is mentioned in the Heian period Wamyō Ruijushō . Archaeologists have found shell middens and the remains mid-Yayoi period pit houses and ceramics on the islands, indicating that it was inhabited in antiquity, but the island is not known to have been inhabited in historic times.
 
The waters surrounding Ōzukumi-jima are noted for the commercial fishing of shrimp and octopus. Local fishermen hold a Shinto ceremony on the island annually in July.

See also

 Desert island
 List of islands

Islands of Mie Prefecture
Uninhabited islands of Japan